In probability and statistics,  point process notation comprises the range of mathematical notation used to symbolically represent random objects known as point processes, which are used in related fields such as stochastic geometry, spatial statistics and continuum percolation theory and frequently serve as mathematical models of random phenomena, representable as points, in time, space or both.

The notation varies due to the histories of certain mathematical fields and the different interpretations of point processes,  and borrows notation from mathematical areas of study such as measure theory and set theory.

Interpretation of point processes

The notation, as well as the  terminology, of point processes depends on their setting and interpretation as mathematical objects which under certain assumptions can be interpreted as random sequences of points, random sets of points or random counting measures.

Random sequences of points

In some mathematical frameworks, a given point process may be considered as a sequence of points with each point randomly positioned in d-dimensional Euclidean space Rd as well as some other more abstract mathematical spaces.  In general, whether  or not  a random sequence is equivalent to the other interpretations of a point process depends on the underlying mathematical space, but this holds true for the setting of finite-dimensional Euclidean space Rd.

Random set of points

A point process is called simple if no two (or more points) coincide in location with probability one. Given that often point processes are simple and the order of the points does not matter, a collection of random points can be considered as a random set of  points The theory of random sets was independently developed by David Kendall and Georges Matheron. In terms of being considered as a random set, a sequence of random points is a random closed set if the sequence has no accumulation points with probability one

A point process is often denoted by a single letter, for example , and if the point process is considered as a random set, then the corresponding notation:

is used to denote that a random point  is an element of (or belongs to) the point  process . The theory of random sets can be applied to point processes owing to this interpretation, which alongside the random sequence interpretation has resulted in a point process being written as:

which highlights its interpretation as either a random sequence or random closed set of points. Furthermore, sometimes an uppercase letter denotes the point process, while a lowercase denotes a point from the process, so, for example, the point  (or ) belongs to or is a point of the point process , or with set notation, .

Random measures

To denote the number of points of  located in some Borel set , it is sometimes written 

In this mathematical expression the point process is denoted by:

.

On the other hand, the symbol:

In the context of random measures,  one  can write:

In other words, a point process can be considered as a random measure that assigns some non-negative integer-valued measure  to sets. This interpretation has motivated a point process being considered just another name for a random counting measure and the techniques of random measure theory offering another way to study point processes, which also induces the use of the various notations used in integration and measure theory.

Dual notation

The different interpretations of point processes as random sets and counting measures is captured with the often used notation  in which:

  denotes a set of random points.

Sums

which has the random sequence appearance, or with set notation as:

or, equivalently, with integration notation as:

where which puts an emphasis on the interpretation of  being a random counting measure. An alternative integration notation may be used to write this integral as:

The dual interpretation of point processes is illustrated when writing the number of  points in a set  as:

In this expression the random measure interpretation is on the left-hand side while the random set notation is used is on the right-hand side.

Expectations

The average or expected value of a sum of functions over a point process is written as:

where (in the random measure sense)  is an appropriate probability measure defined on the space of counting measures . The expected value of   can be written as:

The expectation of such a random sum, known as a shot noise process in the theory of point processes, can be calculated with Campbell's theorem.

Uses in other fields

Point processes are employed in other mathematical and statistical disciplines, hence the notation may be used in fields such stochastic geometry, spatial statistics or continuum percolation theory, and areas which use the methods and theory from these fields.

See also
 Mathematical Alphanumeric Symbols
 Mathematical notation
 Notation in probability
 Table of mathematical symbols

Notes

References